Trayce Jackson-Davis (born February 22, 2000) is an American college basketball player for the Indiana Hoosiers of the Big Ten Conference.

High school career
Jackson-Davis attended Center Grove High School in Greenwood, Indiana. As a junior in 2017–18, he averaged 21.9 points, 9.4 rebounds, 4.1 blocks, and 2.6 assists per game while shooting 67.0 percent from the field; he helped his team to a 20-win season, county and sectional titles and the 4A regional final. In AAU basketball, on the Spiece Indy Heat, he averaged 19.1 points, 7.1 rebounds, and 1.8 assists per game while shooting 59.1% from the field. During his senior season, he led the Trojans to a 21–8 record and a berth in the Class 4A state tournament semifinals. He averaged 21.6 points, 9.3 rebounds, 2.9 blocks, 1.7 assists and one steal per game through 29 games. He entered the state semifinals with 1,768 career points. On January 24, 2019, Jackson-Davis was announced as a McDonald's All-American to participate in the 2019 game, where he finished with 7 points, 5 rebounds, and 1 block in 14 minutes.

Recruiting
He was rated as a four-star recruit by Rivals, 247Sports, and ESPN. During his high school career Jackson-Davis was recruited by numerous high-profile schools, including Indiana, Michigan State, UCLA, Ohio State, Purdue, Xavier, among others. On November 30, 2018, Jackson-Davis committed to playing college basketball for Indiana after narrowing his choices down to Indiana, Michigan State, and UCLA.

College career

Jackson-Davis made his college debut for Indiana during the 2019–20 season with eight points and six rebounds in a 98–65 win over Western Illinois. Jackson-Davis was named Big Ten co-freshman of the week on November 18, after contributing 20 points,  eight rebounds and three blocked shots against North Alabama. He was again named conference freshman of the week on December 2 after scoring 21 points and grabbing 11 rebounds in a victory over Louisiana Tech. On February 19, 2020, Jackson-Davis set career-highs with 27 points and 16 rebounds in a 68–56 win over Minnesota. At the close of the regular season, Jackson-Davis was named to the Third Team All-Big Ten by the coaches and media as well as the All-Freshman Team. He averaged 13.5 points, 8.4 rebounds and 1.8 blocks per game as a freshman. He finished second in the league in field goal percentage (56.6%), and seventh in blocked shots (1.9) and rebounds (8.4). Jackson-Davis, who started in each game his freshman season, was one of only four freshman in the country to lead his team in scoring, rebounding, free throw percentage and blocks.

As a sophomore during the 2020–21 season, Jackson-Davis averaged 19.1 points and 9.0 rebounds per game. Jackson-Davis garnered several awards at the close of the season. He was named a third team All-American by the Sporting News, NABC and USBWA; an honorable mention All-American (AP); All-Big Ten (First Team by media and AP; Second Team by coaches); and a Wooden Award Finalist. 

In the offseason prior to Jackson-Davis's junior year, the 2021–22 season, Mike Woodson was hired as head coach of the Hoosiers and Jackson-Davis announced he was returning for his junior season. On November 27, 2021, he scored a career-high 43 points in a 90–79 win over Marshall, becoming the first Indiana player to score at least 40 points in 27 years. On November 30, 2021, he had 31 points, 16 rebounds and three blocks in a 112–110 double overtime loss to Syracuse. Jackson-Davis was named to the Second Team All-Big Ten and Big Ten All-Defensive Team. As a junior, he averaged 18.3 points, 8.1 rebounds and 2.3 blocks per game. He became the second player in Indiana history (with Alan Henderson with 1,500 points, 750 rebounds, and 150 blocks, and ranked 15th on Indiana's all-time scoring list with 1,588 points, ninth in rebounds (797), seventh in blocked shots (178), and seventh in field-goal percentage (55.8%). On April 9, 2022, Jackson-Davis declared for the 2022 NBA draft while maintaining his college eligibility. On May 20, 2022, Jackson-Davis announced his withdrawal from the draft and his return to Indiana.

Heading in Jackson-Davis's senior year, the 2022–23 season, he garnered substantial national recognition. He was named, among other things, a Blue Ribbon Preseason First Team All-American, Associated Press Preseason All-American, Almanac Preseason Second Team All-American, CBS Sports Preseason Second Team All-American, Big Ten Preseason Player of the Year, Preseason All-Big Ten Team, and The Athletic Preseason Second Team All-American. His January averages of 23 points, over 14 rebounds and over three blocked shots, was one of only 3 (Shaquille O'Neal and Tim Duncan) such months in the last 25 years. On February 7, 2023, Jackson-Davis scored 20 points and posted 18 rebounds in a 66-60 win against Rutgers, in the process surpassing the 2,000 point mark. He became the first person to win four consecutive Big Ten Player of the Week awards since the award's inception in 1981-82.

National team career
Jackson-Davis played for the United States under-18 basketball team at the 2018 FIBA Under-18 Americas Championship. He helped his team win the gold medal.

Career statistics

College

|-
| style="text-align:left;"| 2019–20
| style="text-align:left;"| Indiana
| 32 || 32 || 29.3 || .566 || – || .685 || 8.4 || 1.2 || .7 || 1.8 || 13.5
|-
| style="text-align:left;"| 2020–21
| style="text-align:left;"| Indiana
| 27 || 27 || 34.3 || .517 || – || .655 || 9.0 || 1.4 || .7 || 1.4 || 19.1
|-
| style="text-align:left;"| 2021–22
| style="text-align:left;"| Indiana
| 35 || 35 || 32.3 || .589 || .000 || .674 || 8.1 || 1.9 || .6 || 2.3 || 18.3
|- class="sortbottom"
| style="text-align:center;" colspan="2"| Career
| 94 || 94 || 31.8 || .558 || .000 || .670 || 8.5 || 1.5 || .7 || 1.9 || 16.9

Personal life
Jackson-Davis is the biological son of Dale Davis (former Indiana Pacers Power forward / Center). However, he was raised by his mother and step-father, Raymond Jackson. Originally, Trayce just went by the last name of Davis; however, entering his freshman year of high school, he decided to hyphenate his last name and add on Jackson. He stated, “When I got to high school, I didn’t think it was fair. Ray raised me my whole life, so I did Jackson-Davis. They both want the best out of me, but I would say they do it at different angles." Trayce has two sisters, Caida Davis and Arielle Jackson, as well as a younger brother Tayven Jackson. Tayven was a high school teammate at Center Grove.

On March 15, 2019, Jackson-Davis was honored as the Indiana Gatorade Player of the Year. He received the award not only for his athletic abilities, but also for his academic discipline in maintaining a B average, and his exemplary character in which he volunteered locally as a youth basketball coach and at the Wheeler Mission Center in Indianapolis, serving the homeless and those in need.

See also
 List of NCAA Division I men's basketball players with 2,000 points and 1,000 rebounds

References

External links
Indiana Hoosiers bio
USA Basketball bio

2000 births
Living people
All-American college men's basketball players
American men's basketball players
Basketball players from Indiana
Indiana Hoosiers men's basketball players
McDonald's High School All-Americans
People from Greenwood, Indiana
Power forwards (basketball)